The JW Marriott Edmonton Ice District & Residences is a mixed-use skyscraper in Edmonton, Alberta as part of the downtown Ice District. It is a combination of a JW Marriott hotel in the lower section, with residential condos named Legends Private Residences in the upper section. Construction began in November 2014 and the hotel opened on 1 August 2019.

The hotel is located on the 1st through 22nd floors, and  has 346 rooms,  of conference hall space and a  ballroom. Located from the 23rd through 54th floors is the Legends Private Residences, with high-end condominiums to buy or rent. The tower topped out in March 2018 and reached its final design height on May 8, 2018. Originally the hotel was going to be a Delta hotel, but Marriott closed the purchase deadline first. It is the third JW Marriott hotel in Canada, after the JW Marriott The Rosseau Muskoka Resort & Spa in the District Municipality of Muskoka in Ontario, and the JW Marriott Parq in Vancouver, British Columbia.

See also
List of tallest buildings in Edmonton

References

External links
Ice District - JW Marriott
JW Marriott Hotel & Legends Private Residences (Emporis)
Ice District Hotel & Residences (Skyscraperpage)

Skyscraper hotels in Canada
Skyscrapers in Edmonton
Hotels in Edmonton
Ice District
JW Marriott Hotels
Residential skyscrapers in Canada